RFA Bayleaf (A109) was a Leaf-class support tanker of the Royal Fleet Auxiliary.

Construction
Bayleaf was one of four ships ordered from Cammell Laird at Birkenhead in 1973, and laid down in 1975 as the Hudson Sound. When the ordering company ran into financial difficulties, the ships were laid up, and later were offered for sale or charter. The ship was finally launched on 27 October 1981, and when completed on 25 March 1982 she was then bareboat chartered to the Ministry of Defence (MoD) and renamed Bayleaf.

Service history
She arrived in the Total Exclusion Zone on 9 June 1982, finally returning to Devonport on 31 August.

In January 1991 she sailed from the UK to relieve  during "Operation Granby" – the First Gulf War.

On 1 March 1997 she collided with the Royal Yacht  while carrying out a replenishment at sea (RAS) off Karachi.

In 2001 Bayleaf was purchased outright by the MoD.

From January 2003 to April 2003 she was deployed for "Operation Telic" – the Second Gulf War.

Following the reductions to the Royal Navy fleet outlined in the 2010 "Strategic Defence and Security Review" it was decided that Bayleaf would be paid off in April 2011. The RFA Ensign was scheduled to be lowered for the final time on 20 April 2011 at HMNB Devonport. Following this, the ex-RFA Bayleaf was towed out of Portsmouth on 2 August 2012 to Aliaga in Turkey where the ship was broken up.

See also
 Bristol Group

References

Ships of the Royal Fleet Auxiliary
Leaf-class tankers
Falklands War naval ships of the United Kingdom
1981 ships